Agrupación Deportiva Torpedo 66 is a Spanish football team  based in Cebolla, Toledo  in the autonomous community of Castile-La Mancha. Founded in 1966, its plays in 1ª Autonómica Preferente. Torpedo's stadium is Estadio Municipal de Cebolla with capacity of 2,000 seats.

Season to season

11 seasons in Tercera División

External links
ffcm.es profile
Futbolme.com profile

Football clubs in Castilla–La Mancha
Association football clubs established in 1966
Divisiones Regionales de Fútbol clubs
1966 establishments in Spain
Province of Toledo